The Wimbledon Dons were a professional motorcycle speedway team who operated from the Wimbledon Stadium, Plough Lane in London.

The track opened in 1928 and the Dons operated there from 1929 until 1991. They were closed during the Second World War but upon their reopening in 1946 there were 42,000 people in attendance with an estimated 10,000 more locked outside. The club were very successful at the highest level of British speedway during the 1950s and 1960s, and attracted numerous famous riders.

Having been defunct for eleven years, the team was reopened again in 2002 by Steve Ribbons & David Croucher in the Conference League but were forced to close in 2005, with Ian Perkin, Dingle Brown & Perry Attwood being joint owners of the club, when the stadium owners insisted on dramatically increasing the rent paid by the team to the stadium.

Honours

National League
Champions: 1954, 1955, 1956, 1958, 1959, 1960, 1961

National Trophy
Winners: 1938, 1950, 1951, 1953, 1956, 1959, 1960, 1962

KO Cup (formerly National League Trophy)
Winners: 1968, 1969, 1970

London Cup
Winners: 1938, 1939, 1961, 1964, 1968, 1969, 1970, 1972, 1974, 1975, 1976, 1977, 1978, 1980, 1982, 1983, 1985

RAC Cup
Winners: 1954

Britannia Shield
Winner: 1959

Gauntlet Spring Gold Cup
Winners: 1979

Conference Pairs Champions
Winners: 2004, 2005

Notable riders

 (World Champion 1957, 1958, 1964, 1966)

 (570 most appearances for the club)

 (first England captain)

 (World Champion 1968, 1969, 1970, 1972, 1977, 1979)

 (World Champion 1954, 1959)

 (World Longtrack Champion 1995, 1998, 2000)

Season summary

+2nd when league was suspended

References

Defunct British speedway teams
Speedway teams in London